The 128th IOC Session took place from July 30 – August 3, 2015, in Kuala Lumpur, Malaysia at the Kuala Lumpur Convention Centre. The host city for the 2022 Winter Olympics and the 2020 Winter Youth Olympics were elected during the 128th IOC Session on July 31, 2015.

Bidders

Kuala Lumpur, Malaysia and Lima, Peru placed bids to host the 128th IOC Session. Kuala Lumpur bid to host the 125th IOC Session which took place in 2013, but they lost out to Buenos Aires. Lima's bid to host the IOC Session was ruled out by the evaluation report which resulted in Kuala Lumpur becoming the host city.
Lima later hosted the 131st IOC Session two years after Kuala Lumpur hosted the meeting.

2022 Winter Olympics host city election

The host city of the 2022 Winter Olympics was elected during the 128th IOC Session. Bids for the games were due to the IOC in 2013. In 2014, the IOC decided that Almaty and Beijing (as Oslo withdrew its bid), would become candidate cities, a year before the host city was elected.

Votes results

2020 Winter Youth Olympics host city election

The host city of the 2020 Winter Youth Olympics was also chosen during the same IOC session. The two candidate cities, Lausanne, Switzerland, and Brașov, Romania, were shortlisted in early December.

Votes results

Other agendas

New sports
Participants of session have considered the sports to be added to the Tokyo 2020 program. A new shortlist of eight sports were unveiled on June 22, 2015. These sports include baseball/softball, bowling, karate, roller sports, sport climbing, squash, surfing, and wushu.

The federations of the eight sports made their presentations in Tokyo on August 7–8, 2015. In September 2015, organisers will recommend one or more of the sports to the International Olympic Committee for inclusion in 2020 Olympic program, with the final decision in August 2016.

Recognition of South Sudan
The IOC approved South Sudan's inclusion as a full member of the Committee, allowed the country to participate in Rio 2016 under its national flag. The IOC code for South Sudan Olympic Team is SSD.

See also
123rd IOC Session
 125th IOC Session
 127th IOC Session
 130th IOC Session

References

International Olympic Committee sessions
2015 in Malaysian sport
2015 conferences
2022 Winter Olympics bids
2020 Winter Youth Olympics bids
2010s in Kuala Lumpur
Sport in Kuala Lumpur